The Wild Salmon Center (WSC) is an international conservation organization that works to protect wild salmon, steelhead, char, trout and the ecosystems on which these species depend.  Headquartered in Portland, Oregon, United States, the WSC works with communities, businesses, governments, and other non-profits to protect and preserve healthy salmon ecosystems in the North Pacific.  WSC programs range in location from Russia, Japan, Alaska, British Columbia, Washington State, Oregon, and California.

Background
The WSC was founded as a non-profit by Pete Soverel and Tom Pero in 1992, and was run entirely by volunteers during its first five years.  Originally the WSC received funding for research and conservation through organizing angling trips to the Kamchatka Peninsula in the Russian Far East. These expeditions were a joint venture between the WSC and Moscow State University.  In 1998, WSC hired Guido Rahr as executive director, formerly with the conservation organization Oregon Trout, where he developed an approach to salmon conservation that focused on proactive protection of the strongest remaining populations (stronghold strategy).  The organization expanded rapidly between 1999 and 2010.  A new organization called The Conservation Angler was created in 2003 to take over the ecotourism programs, allowing the WSC to focus solely on science and conservation.  One of the WSC programs, State of the Salmon, a science-based program created in 2003 in collaboration with Ecotrust, used data to track the health and trends of wild salmon populations.  This data was then analyzed, and used to inform salmon management and conservation throughout the Pacific Rim. While State of the Salmon has concluded, sustainable fisheries work continues with a new organization, Ocean Outcomes, which was incubated and launched by Wild Salmon Center in 2015. Ocean Outcomes is a global fishery improvement organization targeting high risk fisheries - the fisheries that face the biggest conservation challenges and have the most to gain from improvements. O2 works hand-in-hand with commercial fisheries and local communities to improve the sustainability of global fisheries.

Stronghold Strategy
Adopted in 1999, the WSC has been focused on a proactive "salmon stronghold" conservation strategy as a regional and international approach to salmon conservation.  Salmon strongholds refer to river ecosystems that contain the most abundant and biologically diverse populations of wild salmon. Select areas on the Kamchatka Peninsula, Sakhalin Island, and the Russian Far East mainland, as well as key watersheds in the lower 48 US States, British Columbia, Bristol Bay and much of Alaska are considered salmon strongholds.  As part of its efforts to protect habitat in Oregon, the Wild Salmon Center is a member of the North Coast State Forest Coalition. In identifying and then protecting salmon strongholds, the WSC aims to conserve healthy salmon stocks before they decline and ensure sustainable fish populations survive for the long term.

See also
 Conservation biology

References 

Salmon
Nature conservation organizations based in the United States
Conservation biology
Environmental organizations based in Oregon
1992 establishments in Oregon